Edward Cuthbert may refer to:

Edward Octavian Cuthbert (1826–1890), Quebec politician
Ned Cuthbert (1845–1905), American baseball player

See also

Cuthbert (surname)